New York City's 31st City Council district is one of 51 districts in the New York City Council. It has been represented by Democrat Selvena Brooks-Powers since a 2021 special election to succeed fellow Democrat Donovan Richards.

Geography 
District 31 covers the farthest southeastern neighborhoods of Queens as well as the eastern section of the Rockaways, including the neighborhoods of Far Rockaway, Laurelton, Rosedale, Arverne, Edgemere, and parts of Springfield Gardens. Rockaway Community Park, Idlewild Park, much of John F. Kennedy International Airport, and some of Jamaica Bay Wildlife Refuge are all located within the district.

The district overlaps with Queens Community Boards 12, 13, and 14, and is contained entirely within New York's 5th congressional district. It also overlaps with the 10th, 14th, and 15th districts of the New York State Senate, and with the 23rd, 29th, 31st, and 32nd districts of the New York State Assembly.

Recent election results

2021 
In 2019, voters in New York City approved Ballot Question 1, which implemented ranked-choice voting in all local elections. Under the new system, voters have the option to rank up to five candidates for every local office. Voters whose first-choice candidates fare poorly will have their votes redistributed to other candidates in their ranking until one candidate surpasses the 50 percent threshold. If one candidate surpasses 50 percent in first-choice votes, then ranked-choice tabulations will not occur.

2021 special
In 2020, Councilmember Donovan Richards was elected as Queens borough president, triggering a February 2021 special election for his seat. Like most municipal special elections in New York City, the race was officially nonpartisan, with all candidates running on ballot lines of their own creation. It was also the first in the city's history to utilize ranked-choice voting (although an earlier special election in the 24th district was nominally ranked-choice, one candidate won with a majority in the first round).

2017

2013

2013 special
In 2012, Councilman James Sanders Jr. was elected to the 10th district of the New York State Senate, triggering a February 2013 special election for his seat. Like most municipal special elections in New York City, the race was officially nonpartisan, with all candidates running on ballot lines of their own creation.

References 

New York City Council districts